T-Motor was the class designation given by the New York Central to its ALCO-GE built T-1a, T-1b, T-2a, T-2b, and T-3a electric locomotives. The T-Motors were the New York Central's second electric locomotive purchase after the original class of S-Motors.  The T-motors continued on in service with the New York Central and a few continued on with the Penn Central after the 1968 merger.

History
ALCO and GE co-built T-Motors from 1913 to 1926 to take over the main line passenger duties from the earlier and somewhat less capable S-Motor classes. Like the rest of the eastern electric fleet T-Motors were only used on the third rail territory from Grand Central Terminal on to the Hudson and Harlem Divisions.  Compared to the S-Motors the T's had more power and with no unpowered wheels all of the locomotive's weight could be transferred into tractive effort.  The T-Motors were also faster than the S-Motors and hauled everything from commuter trains to the flagship 20th Century Limited. 

The first major blow to the fleet of T's was when the Cleveland Union Terminal electrified operations shut down in the mid 1950s, freeing up the fleet of 22 P-Motors for conversion to 3rd rail power.  Although reduced to secondary duties 6 T's survived into the Penn Central era when they were finally replaced by New York, New Haven and Hartford FL9s on the Penn Central roster.

One T Motor, NYC 278, survives in derelict condition near Albany, New York and was recently secured for transport to the Danbury Railway Museum in Danbury, Connecticut for preservation. The remainder of the T-Motors were scrapped.

Footnotes
Penn Central Railroad Online

References

External links
A drawing of a T-Motor in lightning stripe livery

ALCO locomotives
600 V DC locomotives
New York Central Railroad locomotives
B+B-B+B locomotives
Passenger locomotives
Electric locomotives of the United States
Gearless electric drive